Blepharostoma is a genus of liverworts belonging to the family Blepharostomataceae.

The genus was first described by Barthélemy Charles Joseph Dumortier.

The genus has cosmopolitan distribution.

Species:
 Blepharostoma trichophyllum (L.) Dumort.

References

Jungermanniales
Jungermanniales genera